Thomas Denny (born 1956) is a contemporary British painter and stained glass artist.

Denny was born in London, son of Sir Anthony Denny, 8th Baronet of Tralee Castle, and Catherine . He was educated at King Alfred's School, Hampstead, and trained at the Edinburgh College of Art and now lives and works in Dorset. He has exhibited extensively and has had numerous commissions both as a painter and a skilled practitioner of stained glass.

His windows are noted for the distinctive way in which light and colour move across the surface. He achieves this effect by acid etching and silver staining each small piece of glass.

He has been responsible for some 60 stained glass commissions for churches and cathedrals, including the Traherne windows at Hereford Cathedral (2007), the Transfiguration window at Durham Cathedral (2010), and the Wisdom window at St Catharine's College, Cambridge (2012). In 2016 two windows inspired by the life of Richard III were installed in Leicester Cathedral. The windows, which cost £75,000, are sited near the king's tomb in the cathedral.

Denny uses stained glass craftsmen, primarily Patrick Costello, to cut out and lead the stained glass, so Denny can focus on painting and firing the stained glass.

References

External links 
 Official web site
 Glory, Azure and Gold: The Stained-Glass Windows of Thomas Denny (2017) 

1956 births
Living people
People educated at King Alfred School, London
Alumni of the Edinburgh College of Art
English stained glass artists and manufacturers